Villa Comaltitlán is a town and one of the 119 Municipalities of Chiapas, in southern Mexico.

As of 2010, the municipality had a total population of 27,899, up from 26,706 as of 2005. It covers an area of 72 km².

As of 2010, the town of Villa Comaltitlán had a population of 7,201. Other than the town of Villa Comaltitlán, the municipality had 172 localities, the largest of which (with 2010 populations in parentheses) were: Hidalgo (1,640), Lázaro Cárdenas (1,531), and Zacualpa (1,076), classified as rural.

References

Municipalities of Chiapas